The Troubles in Cullyhanna recounts incidents during, and the effects of, the Troubles in Cullyhanna, County Armagh, Northern Ireland.

Timeline of deadly incidents in Cullyhanna during the Troubles:

1972
10 February 1972 - Ian Harris (26) and David Champ (23), both members of the British Army, were killed in a Provisional Irish Republican Army landmine attack on their mobile patrol at Cullyhanna.
20 November 1972 - William Watson (28) and James Strothers (31), both members of the British Army, were killed by a Provisional IRA booby-trap bomb in a derelict house in Cullyhanna.

1988 

 28 July 1988 - Michael Matthews (37), member of the British Army, was killed by the explosion of a landmine planted by the Provisional IRA while on a joint RUC/Army foot patrol outside Cullyhanna

1990
7 May 1990 - Graham Stewart (25), member of the British Army, was killed by machine gun fire from a Provisional IRA unit during Operation Conservation.
30 December 1990 - Fergal Caraher (20), Provisional IRA volunteer and member of Sinn Féin, shot and killed by Royal Marines while travelling in his car in Tullynavall Road, Cullyhanna.

1991
17 August 1991 - Simon Ware (22), member of the British Army, killed by the explosion of a landmine planted by the Provisional IRA while on foot patrol at Carrickrovaddy, near Cullyhanna.

See also
Provisional IRA South Armagh Brigade
Operation Conservation

References

Cullyhanna